Isaac Aketxe Barrutia (born 30 June 1989) is a Spanish professional footballer who plays for UD Alzira as an attacking midfielder.

Club career
Aketxe was born in Bilbao, Biscay. Having emerged through Athletic Bilbao's prolific youth ranks (although he also played youth football with Basque neighbours Arenas Club de Getxo), he made his La Liga debut on 20 September 2009, coming on as a substitute for striker Fernando Llorente in the final ten minutes of a 3–2 home win against Villarreal CF. He spent the vast majority of his first two seasons at the club with the reserve team, in Segunda División B.

For the 2010–11 campaign, Aketxe was loaned to another side in the region, Sestao River Club of the Tercera División. In the summer of 2011, his contract with Athletic was not renewed and he signed for SD Eibar in division three.

Aketxe continued competing in the third tier until his retirement, with Real Sociedad B, Sestao, Cultural y Deportiva Leonesa, Albacete Balompié, FC Cartagena, UCAM Murcia CF and Hércules CF. In 2014–15, while at the service of Cultural, he scored a career-best 20 goals.

Personal life
Aketxe's younger brother, Ager, is also a footballer and a midfielder. He too was groomed at Athletic Bilbao. Their father, known as Isaac Aqueche due to spelling conventions of the time, played as a midfielder in the lower divisions of Spanish football including a spell with Athletic's reserves.

References

External links

1989 births
Living people
Spanish footballers
Footballers from Getxo
Association football midfielders
La Liga players
Segunda División B players
Tercera División players
Primera Federación players
Segunda Federación players
Arenas Club de Getxo footballers
Bilbao Athletic footballers
Athletic Bilbao footballers
Sestao River footballers
SD Eibar footballers
Real Sociedad B footballers
Cultural Leonesa footballers
Albacete Balompié players
FC Cartagena footballers
UCAM Murcia CF players
Hércules CF players
CF La Nucía players
UD Alzira footballers